Patrick Burke (16 April 1879 – 7 February 1945) was an Irish politician. He was first elected to Dáil Éireann at the 1932 general election as a Cumann na nGaedheal Teachta Dála (TD) for the Clare constituency. He was re-elected as a Fine Gael TD at the 1937 general election, and served as a TD until his death in 1945. Following his death, a by-election was held on 4 December 1945, which was won by the Fianna Fáil candidate Patrick Shanahan.

References

1879 births
1945 deaths
Fine Gael TDs
Cumann na nGaedheal TDs
Members of the 7th Dáil
Members of the 8th Dáil
Members of the 9th Dáil
Members of the 10th Dáil
Members of the 11th Dáil
Members of the 12th Dáil
Politicians from County Clare
Irish farmers